All Things Being Equal is the second studio album by English singer and producer Peter Kember, under the stage name Sonic Boom. It was released on 5 June 2020 under Carpark Records.

The album marks 30 years since the release of Sonic Boom's first album in 1990 "Spectrum".

Critical reception
All Things Being Equal was met with "universal acclaim" reviews from critics. At Metacritic, which assigns a weighted average rating out of 100 to reviews from mainstream publications, this release received an average score of 84, based on 10 reviews.

Track listing

Charts

References

2020 albums
Carpark Records albums